Dorthea Dahl (March 20, 1881 – September 11, 1958) was a Norwegian-born American writer.  Dahl has been recognized for her great contributions to Norwegian-American literature. She wrote numerous short stories for magazines, wrote and published collections of short stories and a novel.

Biography
Dahl was born at Osen in Åmot, previously Hedmark, now Innlandet, Norway.  She was the daughter of Peder Person Dahl (1846–1925) and Lene Martinusdatter Ulvevadet Dahl (1839–1918). She came to America in 1883 at the age of two along with her parents and six older siblings. Her family initially lived in a homestead in Day County, South Dakota. In 1900, Dahl began at the State Normal School in Madison, Wisconsin, but the signs of tuberculosis prevented a future as a teacher. She briefly attended St. Olaf College but starting during 1903 would spend her adult life in Kootenai County, near Coeur d'Alene, Idaho. She worked as an accountant for a grain firm, in various trading companies and insurance companies.

Poor health thwarted her hopes of becoming a missionary, but she found consolation in taking part in temperance movement work. Religious by nature, Dahl was active within Lutheran Church organizations, including Daughters of the Reformation and the Rocky Mountain Women's Missionary Federation.

Writing career
Dorthea Dahl was equally competent in both the Norwegian and English languages. She began writing her many stories of small-town and farm immigrant life exclusively in Norwegian, publishing in a variety of periodicals. Dahl wrote several books and a number of short stories published in the Norwegian-American press, most notably in The Friend, published in Minneapolis by Nils Nilsen Ronning.  Between 1917 and 1935, Dahl worked as a staff writer for two Norwegian language publications, the Christmas annual Jul i Vesterheimen and the Norwegian Lutheran Church publication Lutheraneren.

She published two collections of short stories. The first, Fra Hverdagslivet, was written in Norwegian and translated as From Everyday Life. For her second, Returning Home, she wrote in English. Byen paa Berget, her first novel was published in 1925 and was written in Norwegian. That book was later translated as The City Upon A Hill. Dahl continued to write short stories for the rest of her life. Woven into Dahl's immigrant theme is always the conflict between service to others and pursuit of personal success. Dahl showed a pragmatic attitude to the many questions of Norwegian American assimilation and she was an early advocate of the use of English as a church language.

She was honored by the Norwegian Society in America (Det Norske Selskab i Amerika) with its annual literary prize in 1918. She was a representative from the State of Idaho at the Norse-American Centennial in Minneapolis in June 1925.

Selected bibliography
 Fra Hverdagslivet  (Augsburg Publishing. Minneapolis, MN. 1915)
Returning Home (Augsburg Publishing. Minneapolis, MN. 1920)
Byen paa Berget ( Augsburg Publishing. Minneapolis, MN. 1925)

References

Other sources
Brungot, Hilde Petra (1977) Dorthea Dahl: Norwegian American Author of Everyday Experience  (University of Oslo thesis, Norwegian American Historic Association)
Øverland, Orm (1996) The Western Home: A Literary History of Norwegian America (Norwegian American Historical Association. University of Illinois Press.  Chapter 19)

External links

The Promise of America

1881 births
1958 deaths
American Lutherans
20th-century American novelists
People from Sør-Trøndelag
People from Åmot
People from Day County, South Dakota
People from Coeur d'Alene, Idaho
Writers from South Dakota
Novelists from Idaho
Norwegian emigrants to the United States
University of Wisconsin–Madison alumni
St. Olaf College alumni
American women novelists
20th-century American women writers
20th-century Lutherans